Ilya Shinkevich (born 1 September 1989) is a Belarusian professional ice hockey player who is currently playing for HC Dinamo Minsk in the Kontinental Hockey League (KHL). He has previously played in the KHL with Russian entrant, HC Vityaz.

Shinkevich competed in the 2013 IIHF World Championship as a member of the Belarus men's national ice hockey team.

References

External links

1989 births
Living people
Belarusian ice hockey defencemen
HC Dinamo Minsk players
Ice hockey people from Minsk
Metallurg Zhlobin players
Universiade medalists in ice hockey
HC Vityaz players
Universiade silver medalists for Belarus
Competitors at the 2011 Winter Universiade